Pig blood curd, also known as "blood tofu" or "blood pudding", is a popular Cantonese delicacy in Hong Kong, southern China, Taiwan, and Vietnam. It is commonly served with carbohydrates, such as noodles or congee.

Background
Pig blood curd originated from blood rice pudding in southern China. Blood rice pudding is a pastry made from blood and rice grains. Rice is the main ingredient of southern Chinese cuisine; the two common methods to cook rice are steaming and boiling. Duck meat is a source of supplement, however, because of the poor living conditions in the past, poultry was only offered as sacrifices in Chinese festivals. In order to get nutrition from the ducks, farmers saved the blood, steamed it with rice, and served it with sauce. Later, blood rice pudding spread to neighboring towns and villages, and people named it duck blood pudding. However, because of the rising price of duck, and the inability of chicken blood to coagulate into pudding, pig blood replaced duck blood, resulting in the birth of pig blood curd.

Preparation

Pig blood curd is solid pig blood. Manufacturers coagulate fresh blood by letting it sit in a clean container for around 10 minutes. The blood cube is cut into smaller pieces, then heated in a pot with medium heat with water. During the heating process, salt is added to solidify the blood cubes.

Characteristics and variations
Pig blood curd is soft and smooth, as well as slightly chewy. It can be eaten by itself, or served in boiled soup, hot pot, or even made as a snack on a stick.

Pig's blood can also be made into a variety of dishes:
In China, there are recipes like "pig blood curd congee", which is pig blood curd in congee, and "maoxuewang", a Sichuan dish served with pig blood curd, part of the cow's stomach, luncheon meat, eel, some form of intestine, and bean sprouts in Sichuan style spicy soup. In Taiwan, pig's blood is made into a street snack called "pig's blood cake", which is a mixture of pig's blood, fried or steamed sticky rice, and peanut flour served on a stick.

Pig's blood is also made into food by many western countries. For example, in Britain, black pudding (blood sausage) is made from pig's blood and a high proportion of oatmeal.

Nutrition

Pig's blood curd is rich in riboflavin, vitamin C, protein, iron, phosphorus, calcium, niacin and other minerals. Moreover, it is easy for the body to digest and absorb. It also contains a certain amount of lecithin and can curb the harmful effects of low density cholesterol.

Excessive consumption may cause iron poisoning. It might affect the absorption of other minerals. Therefore, it is suggested to eat pig blood no more than twice in a week. Also, it should not be consumed with soya bean or kelp, they may result in indigestion and constipation respectively.

References

External links

Cantonese cuisine
Chinese cuisine
Hong Kong cuisine
Taiwanese cuisine
Vietnamese cuisine
Blood dishes